Japanese pine is a common name for several plants and may refer to:

Pinus densiflora, the Japanese red pine
Pinus thunbergii, the Japanese black pine

Pinus taxa by common names